Girl in a Fur is a 1536–1538 painting by Titian, now in the Kunsthistorisches Museum in Vienna. He painted the same model in La Bella and Venus of Urbino.

Bibliography
Ferraro, Joanne M. (2001) Marriage Wars in Late Renaissance Venice. Studies in the History of Sexuality, 99-0528821-X. Oxford: Oxford University Press. Libris 4615160. 
Goffen, Rona (1997) Titian's Women. New Haven, Connecticut: Yale University Press. Libris 4770583. 
Loos, Viggo (1948). Tizian. Stockholm: Wahlström & Widstrand
Zuffi, Stefano (1999). Titian. London: Dorling Kindersly. 

1538 paintings
Genre paintings by Titian
Paintings in the collection of the Kunsthistorisches Museum
Portraits of women